This is a select list of graduates from the Japanese Imperial Military Academies (1891–1934). It is not complete.

Graduates from the Imperial Japanese Army Academy (Military Academy)

1891 Class
Kazushige Ugaki: 1891

1897 Class
Sadao Araki: November
Jinsaburo Mazaki: November

1904 Class
Tetsuzan Nagata: October

1905 Class
Michitarō Komatsubara

1906 Class
Hiroshi Ōshima

1908 Class
Naruhiko Higashikuni

1912 Class
Torashirō Kawabe: May

1915 Class
Kitsuju Ayabe: May

1921 Class
Akira Mutō: assigned to Military Academy, April

1922 Class
Takushiro Hattori: July

1923 class
Hiromichi Yahara

Graduates from the Japanese Army War College
The following were notable graduates of the Army War College:

1903 Class
Hisaichi Terauchi: December

1909 Class
Otozō Yamada: December

1910 Class
Toshizō Nishio: graduated from War College, assigned to Military Affairs Bureau, November
Koiso Kuniaki: November
Gen Sugiyama: November
Shunroku Hata: graduated with top scholarly rank, November

1911 Class
Yoshijirō Umezu: November
Tetsuzan Nagata: November

1912 Class
Kenji Doihara: November

1913 Class
Yasuji Okamura: November

1914 Class
Rikichi Andō: December
Keisuke Fujie: November
Naruhiko Higashikuni

1915 Class
Hiroshi Ōshima
Hideki Tōjō: December
Masaharu Homma: December
Shōjirō Iida: December
Hitoshi Imamura: December
Masakazu Kawabe

1916 Class
Seishirō Itagaki: November
Tomoyuki Yamashita: November
Shizuichi Tanaka
Shigenori Kuroda: November
Heitarō Kimura: November

1917 Class
Renya Mutaguchi: November
Jun Ushiroku: November
Teiichi Suzuki: November
Kenryo Sato (Chief, Military Affairs Section, War Ministry; Chief, Military Affairs Bureau, same Ministry)
Seizo Arisue (Chief, Second Bureau-Intelligence, Army General Staff)
Tan Nukata (Chief, Third Bureau—Logistics, Army General Staff; Chief, General Affairs Bureau, do; Chief, Personnel Bureau, War Ministry)
Goro Isoya (Chief, Third Bureau-Logistics, Army General Staff)

1918 Class
Korechika Anami: November
Kiichiro Higuchi: November
Kanji Ishiwara: November

1919 Class
Hideyoshi Obata: December
Sōsaku Suzuki: November

1920 Class
Hidemitsu Nakano: November
Kingoro Hashimoto
Akira Mutō

1921 Class
Torashirō Kawabe: November
Harukichi Hyakutake: December

1922 Class
Kiyotake Kawaguchi: November
Hatazō Adachi: November
Takushiro Hattori (Chief, Second Section operations, Army General Staff)
Susumu Nishiura (Chief, Army Affairs Section, War Ministry)
Akiho Ishii (Chief, Military Affairs Section, War Ministry)

1923 Class
Tadamichi Kuribayashi: November
Hong Sa-ik
Okikatsu Arao (Koko) (Chief, Shipping Section, Army General Staff; senior Staff Officer, Army Affairs Section, War Ministry; Chief, Third Section—Organization and Mobilization, Army General Staff)
Hiroo Sato (Chief, War Materiel Section, War Ministry; and an officer who, like Col Arao, had the confidence of War Minister Anami)
Yozo Miyama (Chief, Third Section-Organization and Mobilization, Army General Staffs post which he held before the author assumed it; and Senior Adjutant, War Ministry)
Makoto Matsutani (Chief, 20th Group-War Coordination, Army General Staff; Military Secretary to Prime Minister Suzuki)

1925 Class
Shizuo Yokoyama: November

1927 Class
Takeshi Mori: December

1929
Hiromichi Yahara: returned as an instructor 1937-1940

1930 Class
Takushiro Hattori: November
Masutaro Nakai: December

1931 Class
Masanobu Tsuji

1937 Class
José Laurel III

1944 Class
Takagi Masao (3rd President of South Korea, also known as Park Chung-hee)

Graduates in Military Overseas Studies
Shunroku Hata: Military Student, Germany, March 1912
Hisaichi Terauchi: Military Student, Germany, February 1913
Yoshijirō Umezu: Military Student, Germany, April 1913
Masaharu Homma: Military Student, England, August 1918 (and served as observer with British forces in France)
Hitoshi Imamura: Military Student, England, April 1918; Assistant Military Attaché, England, October 1918
Naruhiko Higashikuni: Resident Officer, France, studying military tactics, April 1920
Tomoyuki Yamashita: Military Student. Germany, July 1921
Hideyoshi Obata: Military Student, England, April 1923; Major, March 1926
Minoru Sasaki: Military Student, U.S.S.R., September 1927; same for Poland and U.S.S.R., August 1928
Torashirō Kawabe: Resident Officer, Riga, Latvia (studying Soviet military affairs), January 1926-September 1928

Students in Army Cavalry School
Kitsuju Ayabe: Equitation Student, October 1917

Graduates from Artillery and Engineering School
Takeo Yasuda: July 1916

Graduates from the Imperial Japanese Naval Academy
Kantarō Suzuki: 1887
Mitsumasa Yonai: 1901
Shigetarō Shimada: November 1904

Graduates from the Naval War College
Kantarō Suzuki: 1898
Shigetarō Shimada: Class "A" Student, December 1913
Mitsumasa Yonai: 1913

Japanese Imperial Military Academies
Imperial Military Academies
Military history of Japan
Japanese military-related lists